Maria Gertrud Metz (born 1746 in Bonn, died 1793 in London), also known as Gertrude or Gertrudis Metz, was a German still life painter.

Life 
Gertrud Metz was baptized on January 15, 1746, in Bonn. Her father was Johann Martin Metz (1717 or 1730 – 1790), a German painter. Among her siblings are counted the painters Conrad Martin Metz (1749–1827) and Caroline Metz.

Her father gave her her first lessons in painting; later in life she went on to attend the Kunstakademie Düsseldorf. One of her artistic role models was the Dutch still-life artist Rachel Ruysch; Metz had had the opportunity to see Ruysch's paintings exhibited in the Gemäldegalerie Düsseldorf. Metz returned from her studies in 1775; at this point her father realized that her artistic skill had overtaken his own.

Getrud Metz's permanent place of residence was in Cologne, but from 1772 she lived with her sister several times. Starting in 1781 she spent time living with her father in London, where she had previously exhibited her works: in 1772 in the Spring Garden Rooms and from 1773 at the Royal Academy of Arts. Her work, as well as her father's, was popular and sought after in London. She died in 1793 in London.

Works 
Gertrud Metz painted still lives, usually depicting flowers, fruit, or animals. Her main media were canvas and copper. Stylistically, her works follow the style of Dutch artists like Rachel Ruysch, whom she much admired. She often signed her works as "Gertr. Metz" or "M. Gerdrudis Metz. F."

List of works (not complete) 

 Stillleben mit Früchten, 55 × 43.5 cm, canvas, Bavarian State Painting Collections - Alte Pinakothek, Munich, Germany (moved 1799 from Galerie Mannheim)
 Blumen in brauer Kelchschale, daneben auf der Marmorplatte des Tisches ein Vogelnest mit Eiern, 55 × 44 cm, canvas, signed, Alte Pinakothek (from 1908; previously Galerie Mannheim)
 Früchtearrangement, 33 × 42 cm, oil on copperplate, Finnish National Gallery
 Blumenstück / Allegorie des Frühlings, LWL-Museum für Kunst und Kultur, Münster, Germany
 Früchtestillleben mit Austern, LWL-Museum für Kunst und Kultur, Münster, Germany
 Tulpe und Nelke mit Schmetterling, Wallraf–Richartz Museum, Cologne, Germany
 two flower paintings, Schleissheim Palace, Munich, Germany
 two still lives (flowers and fruits), Museum Bayreuth
 Stillleben mit Rosen, Tulpen, Narzissen, Chrysanthemen sowie Früchten, einer Schnecke, einer Schlange und Insekten, 76 × 62 cm, oil on canvas, signed

Further reading 

 Metz, Gertrud. In: Jochen Schmidt-Liebich: Lexikon der Künstlerinnen 1700–1900: Deutschland, Österreich, Schweiz. Saur, Munich, 2005, page 317.
 Horst Gerson: Ausbreitung und Nachwirkung der holländischen Malerei des 17. Jahrhunderts. B.M. Israel, Amsterdam 1983, pages 309, 411.
 Emmanuel Bénézit: Dictionnaire critique et documentaire des peintres, sculpteurs, dessinateurs et graveurs de tous les temps et de tous les pays. Volume 7. Gründ, Paris 1976, page 363.
 Metz, Gertrud, In: Hans Vollmer (ed):  Begründet von Ulrich Thieme und Felix Becker. Band 24: Mandere–Möhl. E. A. Seemann, Leipzig 1930, page 444.
 Metz, Gertrud. In: Johann Jakob Merlo: Kölnische Künstler in alter und neuer Zeit. Schwann, Düsseldorf 1895, page 596 (online).
 Metz, Gertraud. In: Georg Kaspar Nagler: Neues allgemeines Künstler-Lexicon. Volume 9. Fleischmann, Munich 1840, page 188 (online).

References 

1746 births
1793 deaths
18th-century German painters
18th-century German male artists
Artists from Bonn
Artists from Cologne
German still life painters
German women painters